Parotocinclus robustus is a species of catfish in the family Loricariidae. It is native to South America, where it occurs in the São Francisco River basin in Brazil. It is found in shallow rivers with slow to moderate flow speed, a depth of 0.4 to 1.5 m (1.31 to 4.92 ft), mostly clear water, and a mixed substrate consisting of stones, gravel, sand, and occasionally mud. The environments inhabited by this species usually have marginal vegetation, which the fish is often found in association with. The species reaches 4.2 cm (1.7 inches) SL.

References 

Loricariidae
Otothyrinae
Fish of the São Francisco River basin
Fish described in 2012